Erick Avari (born Nariman Nariman Erach Avari; 13 April 1952) is an Indian-American  actor whose roles in science-fiction and action productions include Stargate (1994), Independence Day (1996), and The Mummy (1999).

Early life
Erick Avari was born on 13 April 1952 in Darjeeling, West Bengal, India, into a Parsi Zoroastrian family. His father, Erach Dinshaw Avari, ran two movie theatres, the Capital and the Rink. His early education was at the  North Point School, which he attended as a day-scholar. He later studied at the College of Charleston.

Avari is a member of the Avari-Madan family of Darjeeling and Calcutta. His great-great-grandfather was Jamshedji Framji Madan, one of the pioneers of Indian cinema.

Career
Avari has appeared in the films The Beast (1988), Encino Man (1992), Stargate (1994), Independence Day (1996), The Mummy (1999), Planet of the Apes (2001), Home Alone 4 (2002), Mr. Deeds (2002), Daredevil (2003), and Flight of the Living Dead: Outbreak on a Plane (2007). He is one of only two actors, along with Alexis Cruz, to appear in both the original Stargate movie and the spin-off series Stargate SG-1 (three episodes). Before arriving in Los Angeles in 1991, his extensive work onstage garnered him praise from theater critics across America, most notably as Vasquez, in 'Tis Pity She's a Whore with Val Kilmer at the Joseph Papp Public Theater, and as Sir Richard at The Guthrie Theater's memorable production of The Screens.

He has made guest appearances on Castle, The Fresh Prince of Bel-Air, Heroes, Hope & Faith, Law & Order, Burn Notice, Lie to Me, Party Down, Star Trek: The Next Generation, seaQuest DSV, Star Trek: Deep Space Nine, Star Trek: Enterprise, The West Wing, The X-Files, Dharma & Greg, Babylon 5, Alias, The O.C., The Sarah Silverman Program, Leverage, Lois & Clark: The New Adventures of Superman, Covert Affairs, and Human Target. He appeared in cameo roles in JAG; Living People; NYPD Blue; Cheers; Murder, She Wrote; Roseanne; Judging Amy; NCIS; and Everwood. In the video game Zork Grand Inquisitor, he played Grand Inquisitor Mir Yannick, a ruthless dictator who serves as the game's main villain. He also appeared in The Librarian: Return to King Solomon's Mines.

Beginning in the autumn of 2006, a photograph of Avari and a recording of his voice have been used in the role of Chandra Suresh in Heroes. He did not appear onscreen until the episode "Seven Minutes to Midnight", as his character is part of the backstory and had died before the events of the pilot. When his character does appear, it is only in flashbacks until the episode "Six Months Ago", when the story centers on six months before the events of the pilot episode. In this episode, Suresh moves to New York and contacts people on "the list" he generated of those he believes to have special genetic aberrations.

Over the course of his career, Avari has portrayed representatives of more than 24 ethnicities. As of November 2006, he has appeared in 33 feature films and over 70 television episodes. Avari has appeared with Brent Spiner in three different productions: Star Trek: The Next Generation (1987), Independence Day (1996), and The Master of Disguise (2002). He performed opposite Richard Gere in a drama film based on a true story: Hachi: A Dog's Tale, in which he played Jasjeet, an Indian hot dog vendor.

Avari was scheduled to reprise in his role as Kasuf in the Stargate SG-1 Season Six finale "Full Circle", but was unable to do so due to his commitment to Dragnet (2003).

In January 2009, he played a mobile-phone salesman in Paul Blart: Mall Cop, and in October 2009, he was cast as Omar on Days of Our Lives.

In 2014, Avari voiced Master Rahool in the science fiction video game Destiny.

In 2017, Avari was seen in both the U.S conspiracy thriller Project Eden: Vol. I and, in 2019, as Nicodemus in the television historical series The Chosen based on the life of Jesus Christ.

Filmography

Film

Television

Video games

References

External links

1951 births
Living people
20th-century American male actors
20th-century Indian male actors
21st-century American male actors
21st-century Indian male actors
American male actors of Indian descent
American male film actors
American male musical theatre actors
American male Shakespearean actors
American male stage actors
American male television actors
American people of Parsi descent
American Zoroastrians
Indian emigrants to the United States
Indian male film actors
Indian male musical theatre actors
Indian male stage actors
Indian male television actors
Indian Zoroastrians
Male actors from West Bengal
Parsi people
People from Darjeeling